Kupfer is a German surname (meaning copper); notable people with this surname include:

David Kupfer (born 1941), American psychiatrist
Harry Kupfer (1935–2019), German opera director
Herbert Kupfer (1927–2013), German civil engineer
Jochen Kupfer (born 1969), German operatic baritone
Bettina Kupfer (born 1963), German actress and writer

See also: 

German-language surnames
Occupational surnames